The Mary Wallopers are a contemporary Irish folk music group based in Dundalk, County Louth, consisting of brothers Charles and Andrew Hendy, and Sean McKenna.

Background 
Charles Hendy has stated that the band's biggest thematic influence has been "reactionary stuff to poverty", while the band credit Jinx Lennon as being among their biggest musical influences. The Mary Wallopers cultivated a large fanbase following their gigs they live-streamed from the Hendys' home during lockdowns related to the COVID-19 pandemic. They released their, self-titled, debut album in October 2022.

TPM 
The Hendy brothers also perform as TPM, a comedy rap duo that are explicitly political, and like The Mary Wallopers are an anti-capitalist group. TPM is shorthand for Taxpayer's Money. TPM rose to prominence in 2015 following the viral sharing of a recording of their first song, All the Boys on the Dole.

Discography 

 A Mouthful of the Mary Wallopers (6 July 2019)
 The Mary Wallopers (28 October 2022)

References

Notes

Sources 

 

Irish folk musical groups